Results from Norwegian football in 1931. See also 1930 in Norwegian football and 1932 in Norwegian football

Class A of local association leagues
Class A of local association leagues (kretsserier) is the predecessor of a national league competition.

1In the following season, Romerike local association changed name to Vestre Romerike.
2In the following season, Trysil og Engerdal local association changed name to Sør-Østerdal.

Norwegian Cup

Final

Northern Norwegian Cup

Final

National team

Sources:

References

 
Seasons in Norwegian football